Sterling Leroy Pennix Jr. (born October 28, 1988), better known by his stage name Hoodrich Pablo Juan, is an American rapper. He is best known for his track "We Don't Luv Em".

Career 
Pennix started pursuing a rap career in 2014 after he released a song titled "Go Get Money" and featured on a Peewee Longway track titled "African Diamonds". He released a string of mixtapes during 2015 to 2017, and was later signed to Gucci Mane's label 1017 Records. He gained attention with his track "We Don't Luv Em".

Discography

Studio albums

Mixtapes

Extended plays

Singles

As lead artist

As featured artist

References 

1988 births
Living people
Rappers from Newark, New Jersey